Robert Wazinger (born August 23, 1966) is a retired Austrian football player who played for the Austria national football team.

Career
Wazinger made 381 Austrian Football Bundesliga appearances during his playing career, winning the league five times and the Austrian Cup twice. After he retired from playing, Wazinger became at assistant coach at WSG Wattens.

References

1966 births
Living people
Austrian footballers
Austria international footballers
FC Wacker Innsbruck (2002) players
WSG Tirol players

Association football defenders
FC Tirol Innsbruck players
People from Innsbruck-Land District
Footballers from Tyrol (state)